Sorana Cîrstea and Anabel Medina Garrigues were the defending champions, but Cîrstea decided not to participate.
Medina Garrigues played alongside Renata Voráčová. They lost to Eleni Daniilidou and Michaëlla Krajicek in the quarterfinal.
Alisa Kleybanova and Galina Voskoboeva became the champions, beating Daniilidou and Krajicek 6–4, 6–2 in the final.

Seeds

Draw

Draw

References
 Main Draw

Estoril Open - Women's Doubles
2011 Estoril Open